The đàn nguyệt ( "moon lute", Chữ Nôm: 彈月) also called nguyệt cầm (Chữ Hán: 月琴), đàn kìm, is a two-stringed Vietnamese traditional musical instrument.  It is used in both folk and classical music, and remains popular throughout Vietnam (although during the 20th century many Vietnamese musicians increasingly gravitated toward the acoustic and electric guitar). It may be descended from the Ruan (Chinese: 阮; pinyin: ruǎn), a Chinese instrument. 

The đàn nguyệt's strings, formerly made of twisted silk, are today generally made of nylon or fishing line.  They are kept at a fairly low tension in comparison to the guitar and other European plucked instruments.  This, and the instrument's raised frets, allow for the bending tones which are so important to the proper interpretation of Vietnamese traditional music.  Such bending tones are produced by pressing the string toward the neck rather than bending to the side.  The strings are generally plucked with a small plectrum; often a plastic guitar pick is used.

The instrument's standard Vietnamese name, đàn nguyệt, literally means "moon string instrument" (đàn is the generic term for "string instrument" and nguyệt means "moon").  Its alternate name, nguyệt cầm, also means "moon string instrument" (cầm meaning "string instrument" in Sino-Vietnamese, coming from the Chinese yuèqín, 月琴).

See also
Yueqin
Music of Vietnam
 Ruan (instrument) - Chinese instrument

References

External links

Video
Đàn nguyệt video

Necked lutes
Vietnamese musical instruments